KBFE-LP is a low power radio station in Bakersfield, California.

History
KBFE-LP began broadcasting on May 26, 2015.

References

External links

2015 establishments in California
Mass media in Bakersfield, California
BFE-LP
Radio stations established in 2015
BFE-LP
BFE-LP